Broadway High School is a public secondary school in Broadway, Virginia. It is located at 269 Gobbler Drive.

History
The original Broadway School was a small, one-room building that opened in the mid-1870s and was taught by C. E. Barglebaugh, just eighteen years old. Four rooms were added over the years, but it burned down in 1907. A brick building with a library, office, auditorium, and six rooms replaced it. A high school was built adjacent to that building in 1920, and grade school and high school were divided. A new facility built west of the town in the 1950s was used as a high school until completion of the current building at its current location in January 1998, upon which time it became J. Frank Hillyard Middle School, named for its former principal. The SCA buried a time capsule in 1992 that will be opened in 2032.

Athletics
Girls Rock, Paper, Scissors
The Broadway Girls' Rock, Paper, Scissors Team traveled to Aiken, South Carolina in 2018 for the RPS Tournament.
Coached by Devin Cashman
Track and field (indoor–outdoor)
Brett Olinger was the two-time state champion in the 300 meter hurdles (2005-2006).
Cross country
Coached by Darrell Zook
Tennis
The Broadway Boys' Tennis Team was undefeated, and thus the champions, of the 9-school Valley District in 2007.
Number 1 seeded Martin Donaire was Broadway's first ever Massanutten District Tennis Champion in Singles and Doubles in 2008.
Coached by Derrick Trumbo
Boys Basketball
Varsity Head Coach: Dwight Walton
2007-08 - Varsity reached the Region 3 semifinal game for the first time in school history.
2007-08 - Junior Varsity finished with an 18–3 record.
2009-10 Region 3 champions.
Girls Basketball
Varsity Head Coach: Jeremy Fulk (2021-present)
Between the years of 2013-2017 the girls basketball team went to 3 of the 4 state championship games. In 2013/2014 falling to district rival Spotswood, in 2015/2015 falling to district rival Turner Ashby in the title games.
In the 2016/2017 season led by a group of 6 seniors the Broadway Girls basketball team won the first ever group sport state title beating Magna Vista in the title game.
The 2016/2017 team also won the district and conference titles going undefeated in district and conference play. Beating the reigning state championship team by 30 points (50-20) in the conference title game.
Football
Varsity Head Coach: Danny Grogg
2007 Massanutten District Champions.
Had five players sign LOIs to play football in college after the 2007 season.
Brett Olinger carried the ball over a thousand yards in his high school career.
Abel Uribe holds the school record with a 46-yard field goal.
The junior varsity football team finished the 2008 season undefeated
In 2011 Broadway went undefeated in the regular season and won both the Valley  District and Region 3 Championships. The 2011 team finished with the best record in school history: 12–1.
In 2014 Broadway won the Valley District championship and finished the season with a 9–3 record.
2021: Co-Valley District Champions.  Advanced to the Region 3C Semifinals.
Volleyball
Golf
Wrestling
Coached by Nate Bradley
Swimming
 Coached by Ashlee Sites and Matt Fulk
 Founded in 2004, Broadway swimming has continued to improve throughout the years. In 2008, the entire team qualified for Regional Three Meet, and five Broadway swimmers; Andrew Bahr, Justin Chambers, Ashleigh Ray, Zachary Ritchie, and Sam Roderick, attended VHSL AA State Championships at George Mason University, competing in five events. In 2009, the team size doubled and Broadway swimming became more competitive. Also in 2009- Andrew Bahr, Justin Chambers, Sydney Collins, Hunter Good, and Sam Roderick attended VHSL AA State Championships at University of Virginia. In 2015, the team of Daniel Beyeler, Paul Armentrout, Joseph Whitmire, Jesse Pierce, Nate Snider, And Zach Hiter competed in the AAA State meet at Christiansburg Aquatic Center.
Softball 
Varsity Head Coach: Becky Cantrell
Baseball 
Varsity Head Coach: Tim Turner
Girls Soccer- Team coached by Randy Black went on to win the District Championship in 2013/2014. Team was then coached by Bobby Mongold from 2015/2016-2018/2019. The 2016 team went on to play in the district, conference, and regional title games. Followed by the first ever trip to the state soccer tournament, losing in the semi finals by a score of 1–0. The 2017 team went on to play in the district, and conference championship games before falling in regionals.
Broadway has had 2 district player of the years since 2010. One coming in 2016 and the other following in 2017.

Band department
The band department is currently headed by Candice Flake, and consists of Concert Band for the younger musicians, Wind Ensemble for mostly upperclassmen, and the Jazz band year round. Marching band begins in late summer and generally ends with a Christmas parade. For those who aren't in the cast or crew of the spring musical, there is pit orchestra. Broadway Band Department earned the status of Virginia Honor Band in both 2007 and 2010 as well as the Music Department earning the honor of Blue Ribbon School in 2010.

Marching Band
2005: (Fate of the Gods) First place in class A Parade of Champions at James Madison University
2005: (Fate of the Gods) Excellent Rating at VBODA
2006: (Ghost Train) First place in class A Parade of Champions at James Madison University
2006: (Ghost Train) Superior Rating at VBODA
2007: (Dances from Estancia) Superior Rating at VBODA
2008: (The Mask of Zorro) Excellent Rating at VBODA
2009: (Artist's Palette) Superior Rating at VBODA
2010: Dreams and Nightmares, an original composition by Ben Frenchak - Superior Rating at VBODA and First Place in Class A at Parade of Champions, hosted by James Madison University
2013: Transcendent Journey - Superior Rating at VBODA
2014: Mirror Images- Excellent Rating at VBODA 
2015: Trials and Triumphs- Superior Rating at VBODA
2021: Of Bells and Angels- Superior Rating at VBODA
2022: Across the Universe- Superior Rating at VBODA

Wind Ensemble
2004 Superior Rating at VBODA
2005 Superior Rating at VBODA
2006 Superior Rating at VBODA
2007 Superior Rating at VBODA
2008 Superior Rating at VBODA
2009 Superior Rating at VBODA
2010 Superior Rating at VBODA
2011 Superior Rating at VBODA
2012 Superior Rating at VBODA
2013 Superior Rating at VBODA
2014 Superior Rating at VBODA

Concert Band

Jazz Band

Theatre department

Fall productions
1984: MASH
1985: Barefoot in the Park
1986: What a Life
1987: Where the Lilies Bloom
1989: No Mother to Guide Her: or More to Be Pitied than Censured

Fall one-act plays
Mr. Reger directed them until he left, then Ms. Dickerson and Mrs. Tate ran them, and Andrea Bentley, Andrea Sisk, took over for a year, but now Mr. Reger has returned. In 2013, Mrs. Johnson started directing.
2003: Skip to My Loo
2004: Love of One's Neighbor
2005: Property Rites
2006: Meeting Sam
2007: Requiem
2008: Patients
2009: The Winner
2010: The Box
2011: Reflex Action
2012: The Formula
2013: Booby Trap (play)

Spring musicals
1. Directed by Kim Tate and Scott Zane Smith (1996 - 2000).

2. Directed by Kim Tate and Holly Dickerson (2001 - 2012).

3. Directed by Kim Tate and Holly (Dickerson) King (2013).

4. Directed by Kim Tate and Wes Dunlap (2014).

5. Directed by Tim Reger and Wes Dunlap (2015).

6. Directed by Claire Covington and Luke Black (2016-2017).

7. Directed by Claire Covington and Kaitlyn Townsend (2018).
1978: Oliver
1979: West Side Story
1980: South Pacific
1981: Fiddler on the Roof
1983: The Wizard of Oz
1984: Anything Goes
1985: Ducktails and Bobbysox
1986: Babes in Arms
1987: The Sound of Music
1988: Hello Dolly
1989: Cinderella
1990: 42nd Street
1996: Fiddler on the Roof
1997: The Wizard of Oz
1998: Hello Dolly
1999: Guys and Dolls
2000: My Fair Lady
2001: The Sound of Music
2002: Oklahoma!
2003: Meet Me in St. Louis
2004: 42nd Street
2005: Beauty and the Beast
2006: Seven Brides for Seven Brothers
2007: On the Town
2008: The King and I
2009: Singin' in the Rain
2010: White Christmas
2011: Annie Get Your Gun
2012: Fiddler On the Roof
2013: Crazy for You
2014: The Music Man
2015: Chitty Chitty Bang Bang
2016: Beauty and the Beast
2017: Peter Pan
2018: Bye Bye Birdie
2019: Big Fish (musical)
2020: Roald Dahl's Willy Wonka
2022: Tuck Everlasting

Academics
The Broadway Academic team of '06-'07 had twenty-six members: one freshman, six sophomores, one junior, and eighteen seniors. Their A team beat all schools at least once save for Lee and Rockbridge.

Broadway High School is also a participant in Massanutten Regional Governor's School for Integrated Science and Technology, alongside all the other schools in the district.

Clubs
DECA
Drama
Future Farmers of America
Community Involvement Club
Technology Student Association - 2008-09 - 1st Place in State & 3rd Place in National TSA Conference, Radio Controlled Transportation - Daniel Rittenhouse & Jeremy Evans & 2009-10 - 1st Place in State TSA Conference, Radio Controlled Transportation - Daniel Rittenhouse & Jeremy Evans
Science
Future Educators of America
Youth in Government
World Language Honors Society
Latin
Tri-M Music Honors Society
Youth Alcohol and Drug Abuse Prevention Project
A.C.E.S.
National Honors Society
National Art Honors Society
9th and 10th Grade Book Club
Book Gobblers
Cheerleading

References

"The History of Broadway High School"
 Massanutten Regional Governor's School Homepage

Public high schools in Virginia
Educational institutions established in 1872
Schools in Rockingham County, Virginia
1872 establishments in Virginia